Beckton is the eastern terminus of the Beckton branch of the Docklands Light Railway (DLR) in the Docklands area of east London. It is in Travelcard Zone 3.

History
When the London Docks and Beckton Gasworks were active, they were served by a railway system. A separate station known as Beckton existed on this earlier network, several hundred yards east of Beckton DLR station, until its closure in December 1940.

In 1973, a government report on the redevelopment of London's Docklands proposed an extension of the unbuilt Fleet line from Charing Cross via Fenchurch Street to Beckton. The proposal was developed during the 1970s as the Fleet line developed into the Jubilee line. The route was approved in 1980 with the main route running via Custom House and Silvertown to Woolwich Arsenal. Beckton would have been the terminus of a branch line operated as a shuttle service from Custom House. Financial constraints meant that the route was not proceeded with. By the start of the 1990s new plans had been developed to extend the Jubilee line on a route south of the River Thames towards Stratford.

The DLR branch from Poplar was opened on 28 March 1994. The station was originally in Travelcard Zone 4 and was moved to Zone 2/3 in January 2000.

Location
The next station is Gallions Reach, but between the two stations the line curves through 180 degrees, such that westbound trains for Central London depart Beckton heading east. Beckton station is located north and slightly further west of Cyprus, the station after Gallions Reach. During peak hours, trains from Beckton depart for Tower Gateway and Bank. Off-peak, trains alternate between Tower Gateway and Canning Town station.

Beckton DLR depot, the principal depot for the DLR system, is located between Beckton and Gallions Reach stations, but is closer to the latter.

Like all open-air DLR stations, Beckton is unmanned and tickets are bought at the ticket machines. New machines were installed in January 2009 that now allow Oyster card users to top-up their pre-pay balance and see their journey history. During 2007–2008, a new bus station was constructed directly opposite the DLR station. This opened in the first week of November 2008.

Services
The Beckton branch of the DLR is unusual, in that it has more frequent trains off-peak than it does during peak hours. This is because during peak hours, all trains coming from Stratford International go to Woolwich Arsenal instead.

Connections

There is a bus station directly in front of the station offering services right across East London.

References

External links

Beckton station page on TfL site

Docklands Light Railway stations in the London Borough of Newham
Railway stations in Great Britain opened in 1994
Beckton DLR station